{{DISPLAYTITLE:C12H17N3O}}
The molecular formula C12H17N3O (molar mass: 219.28 g/mol, exact mass: 219.1372 u) may refer to:

 Cimaterol
 RO5166017